Aliabad (also Romanized as ‘Alīābād and ‘Alī Ābād; also known as Ahābād) is a village in Sornabad Rural District, Hamaijan District, Sepidan County, Fars Province, Iran. At the 2006 census, its population was 237, in 68 families.

References 

Populated places in Sepidan County